Swami Prakashananda may refer to:
 Swami Prakashananda (Chinmaya Mission), Acharya of Chinmaya Mission of Trinidad and Tobago
 Swami Prakashananda (Sushil Maharaj) (1874–1927), monk of the Ramakrishna Order